Local elections were held in Talisay City on May 9, 2022 within the Philippine general election. Registered voters of the city will be electing candidates for the following elective local posts: mayor, vice mayor, and ten councilors.

Mayoral election 
Incumbent mayor Gerald Anthony Gullas Jr. is vying for a second term. He is running against incumbent vice mayor Alan Bucao.

Vice mayoral election 
Incumbent vice mayor Alan Bucao is running for mayor thereby making it an open seat. Former city councilor Richard Francis Aznar and former Tabunok barangay councilor aspirant Rico Almaria will compete for the seat.

City Council elections 

Incumbents are expressed in italics.

By ticket

Nacionalista Party/Team Alayon, Team Aksyon Agad

Partido para sa Demokratikong Reporma/Barug Lumad Talisaynon

Aksyon Demokratiko

Independent

By candidate

References 

2022 Philippine local elections
Elections in Cebu
May 2022 events in the Philippines